Osmodes lindseyi, the black-tufted white-spots, is a butterfly in the family Hesperiidae. It is found in Guinea, Sierra Leone, Liberia, Ivory Coast, Ghana, Nigeria, Cameroon, Gabon and the Central African Republic. The habitat consists of forests and secondary growth with a full canopy.

Subspecies
Osmodes lindseyi lindseyi (Nigeria, Cameroon, Gabon, Central African Republic)
Osmodes lindseyi occidentalis Miller, 1971 (Guinea, Sierra Leone, Liberia, Ivory Coast, Ghana)

References

Butterflies described in 1964
Erionotini